Sphagnum russowii, Russow's sphagnum or Russow's bogmoss, is a species of peat moss with a Holarctic distribution.

References

External links
Sphagnum russowii @ Moss Flora of China

russowii